Saijuwal Takura   is market center in Sharada Municipality in Salyan District in the Rapti Zone of western-central Nepal. The place formerly existing as Village Development Committee was annexed to form a new municipality since 18 May 2014. At the time of the 1991 Nepal census it had a population of 3,137 living in 593 individual households.

Media
Saijuwal Takura has an FM community radio station, Radio Rapti - 104.8 MHz.

References

External links
UN map of the municipalities of Salyan District

Populated places in Salyan District, Nepal